Dimethylnortestosterone may refer to:

 Dimethandrolone (7α,11β-dimethyl-19-nortestosterone)
 Dimethyltrienolone (7α,17α-dimethyl-19-nor-δ9,11-testosterone)
 Mibolerone (7α,17α-dimethyl-19-nortestosterone)

See also
 Methylnortestosterone